Proto-Aslian is the reconstructed proto-language of the Aslian languages of Peninsular Malaysia and southern Thailand. It has been reconstructed by Timothy Phillips (2012).

Reconstructed forms
The 289 reconstructed Proto-Aslian forms below are from Phillips (2012:259-262).

 *[bə]teew 'water, river'
 *[ca(n)]bɨŋ 'spider'
 *[d/g]arɯɯɲ 'termite'
 *[gə]liik 'to swallow'
 *[gə]rɛɛs 'liver'
 *[ɟa]lɯɯʔ 'pig'
 *[kə]soom 'nest'
 *[lə]bit 'to close (eyes)'
 *[m/n]uay 'one'
 *[pə]tam 'to plant'
 *[s/h]uəc 'to whistle'
 *[s]paay 'new'
 *[sa]tam 'right (side)'
 *[tam]pɯɯs 'to sweep'
 *[ʔa]tiɛʔ 'earth'
 *[ʔən]cɛɛn 'cooked'
 *{(–)l–} '(iterative)'
 *{(-)m-} '(nominalizer agentive)'
 *{(-)n-} '(nominalizer)'
 *{pər-} '(causative)'
 *{–ra–} '(plural/comparative)'
 *baay 'to dig'
 *bakaʔ 'descendant'
 *baliiŋ 'sky'
 *baʔ 'to carry on back'
 *bəhɔ(ɔ)l 'deer'
 *bəhiiʔ 'sated (of food)'
 *bək 'to tie'
 *bəkaaw 'flower'
 *bəkah 'to break'
 *bəlaaw 'blowgun'
 *bəliiŋ 'arm'
 *bəlooʔ 'thigh'
 *bənɨ(ɨ)m 'mountain'
 *bərɔl 'dart butt'
 *bəriʔ 'forest'
 *bətees 'mushroom'
 *bəy[oo]k 'white'
 *bəʔaak 'flood'
 *bəʔet 'good'
 *bɨt 'hot'
 *bɯɯl 'drunk'
 *bɯɯʔ 'to suck'
 *boh 'to put/place'
 *bus 'cane'
 *buyaaʔ 'alligator'
 *ca(a)l 'to say'
 *caaʔ 'to eat'
 *cah 'cah'
 *cap 'to catch'
 *cɔk 'to stab'
 *cɛ(ɛ)s 'to tear'
 *cɛ(ɛ)ʔ 'louse'
 *cə(n)ruas 'fingernail'
 *cədaaw 'rainbow'
 *cədək 'to hiccup'
 *cɛɛm 'bird'
 *cɛɛn 'to cook'
 *cəgɛh 'hard'
 *cəkʔiɛk 'gecko'
 *cəloon 'back'
 *cəma(a)ʔ 'sharp'
 *cəntɯɯgŋ 'drum'
 *cəŋcɛ̃ɛ̃ŋ 'eyebrow'
 *cərəs 'rib'
 *cəruuʔ 'winnow basket'
 *ciip 'to walk'
 *cɨl 'tattoo'
 *coom 'to burn'
 *cuam 'to dig'
 *cuəh 'to defecate'
 *cuəʔ 'dog'
 *daŋ 'to see'
 *dɔŋ 't.o. monkey'
 *deh 'they (3P)'
 *dəka(a)n 'bamboo rat'
 *dəlũũʔ 'to push'
 *dɯɯŋ 'house'
 *duuy 'afternoon'
 *gaal 'waist'
 *gaɲ 'to bite'
 *gɔl 'to carry on back'
 *gəcɛɛʔ 'moon'
 *gəhɛɛt 'sweet'
 *gəlisɛɛh 'to whisper'
 *gəluk 'to laugh'
 *gəriɛŋ 'monitor lizard'
 *gətɔh 'to spit'
 *gɨn 'they (3P)'
 *gɯɯm 'to winnow'
 *gulam 'to carry on shoulder'
 *guul 'mortar'
 *hã(ã)n 'where'
 *haar 'we two (1D.IN)'
 *halap 'to raft'
 *hawa(a)r 'mucus'
 *heeʔ 'you (2S)'
 *hə̃m 'to breathe'
 *hiiʔ 'we (1P.IN)'
 *hiŋkaaʔ 'to play'
 *ɟaam / *ʔiɟaam 'to cry'
 *ɟak 'to step on'
 *ɟaŋka(a)ʔ 'chin/jaw'
 *ɟarlaaʔ 'thorn'
 *ɟɔ̃ɔ̃t 'to suck'
 *ɟeeʔ 'we (1P.EX)'
 *ɟəhuuʔ 'tree'
 *ɟəl 'to bark'
 *ɟəʔaaŋ 'bone'
 *ɟɨk 'to breathe'
 *ɟɯɯk 'to move'
 *ɟuŋ 'foot/leg'
 *k[a]niɛʔ 'mouse'
 *k[a]ʔiɛp 'centipede'
 *kaac 'to scratch'
 *kaaʔ 'fish'
 *kamiɛk 'to carry under arm'
 *kaɲɔŋ 'elbow'
 *kanɛ(ɛ)t 'small'
 *kap 'to bite'
 *karɛɛy 'thunder'
 *karəŋ 'tree trunk'
 *kawããp 'bear'
 *kayoot 'pregnant'
 *kɔɔɲ 'male'
 *ke 'he/she (3S)'
 *ke(e)ŋ 'to pull'
 *kə(n)siir 'husband'
 *kəbəc 'to fish'
 *kəbɛɛc 'to spit'
 *kəbɨɨʔ 'fruit'
 *kəbɨs 'to die'
 *kəboʔ 'mosquito'
 *kədɛk 'bitter'
 *kɛɛʔ 'to seek'
 *kəhuəy 'to gape'
 *kəl 'to fall'
 *kəlaaŋ 'eagle'
 *kəlapuəh 'shoulder'
 *kəlɨɨt 'firefly'
 *kəluəŋ 'inside'
 *kəm 'to obtain'
 *kəmbaar 'twin'
 *kəmeet 'mosquito'
 *kəmooc 'ghost'
 *kəmuar 'worm, caterpillar'
 *kəmuən 'nephew'
 *kəɲaaŋ 'quick'
 *kəndah 'wife'
 *kəpiil 'turtle'
 *kərɔʔ 'back'
 *kərɟɛr 'to dance'
 *kəroom 'under'
 *kərual 'knee'
 *kəteŋ 'calf (leg)'
 *kətɯɯʔ 'skin, bark'
 *kəyɔŋ 'to hear'
 *kiɛt 'anus'
 *kipaaŋ 'top'
 *kɯɯʔ 'to vomit'
 *kooɲ 'male'
 *krkbaak 'butterfly'
 *kuəm 'to hold, grasp'
 *kuən 'child'
 *kuuy 'head'
 *lakuəm 'brain'
 *las 'ant'
 *lɛc 'wrong/miss'
 *ləda(a)ʔ 'armpit'
 *leew 'bamboo'
 *ləhiɛŋ 'saliva'
 *lək 'quiver'
 *ləmooɲ 'tooth'
 *ləɲsiɲ 'gums'
 *ləntaak 'tongue'
 *ləŋɛ(ɛ)ʔ 'neck'
 *ləsəm 'rain'
 *ləwɛɛy 'bee'
 *liɛp 'to plait (leaves)'
 *m(??)h 'you (2S)'
 *mahaam 'blood'
 *man 'to play'
 *mat 'eye'
 *mɔɔh 'nose'
 *məriɛm 'how many?'
 *miɛŋ 'cheek'
 *mro(o)ɲ 'louse'
 *muuh 'to bathe'
 *napak 'boar'
 *nɔɔm 'to urinate'
 *nɛŋ 'before'
 *niis 'mat'
 *nooŋ 'road'
 *ɲooʔ 'to suck'
 *padaw 'bee'
 *pak 'to chop'
 *paraaʔ 'shelf'
 *pareeʔ 'monitor lizard'
 *pəhɨɨm 'to break wind'
 *pəlɛ(ɛ)ʔ 'astonished'
 *pəleek 'bat'
 *pəlɛɛʔ 'fruit'
 *pələm 'leech'
 *pəluaŋ 'roof'
 *pənlɯɯŋ 'egg'
 *pərəc 'wing'
 *pəʔaas 'turtle'
 *pɨɨt 'to extinguish'
 *pɨt 'to blow'
 *puk 'chicken'
 *rəmpiɛt 'to thresh'
 *rəwaay 'soul'
 *riɛt 'to wring'
 *rudɔŋ 'friend'
 *ruəp 'friend'
 *ruəy 'fly'
 *ruuy 'to sow'
 *rʔiɛs / ʔriɛs 'root'
 *sa(a)r 'to descend'
 *sɔɔk 'hair, feather'
 *sɛ(ɛ)ɲ 'end'
 *sə[n]taaʔ 'tail'
 *sɛc 'flesh'
 *sɛɛh 'to pound'
 *sɛɛl 'shy'
 *səgu(u)ʔ 'to ask, request'
 *səlaay 'field'
 *səlaaʔ 'leaf'
 *səlɨʔdeʔ 'cockroach'
 *səluuh 'to blowpipe'
 *səmaaɲ 'to ask'
 *səmaaʔ 'human being'
 *səŋɛc 'cold'
 *səŋəp 'darkness'
 *siɛc 'to steal'
 *siɛm 'to forget'
 *sisɛʔ 'to dance'
 *siyãʔ 'house'
 *sɯɯc 'to sting'
 *suək 'navel'
 *suəm 'marrow'
 *suuc 'to wash'
 *suup 'lung'
 *taaɲ 'to plait, weave'
 *tabooʔ 'thumb'
 *taɟaak 'to carry in hand'
 *taɟuuʔ 'snake'
 *talun 'python'
 *tawɔɔh 't.o. gibbon'
 *tawiiŋ 'spider'
 *tɔɔt 'to burn'
 *təbiŋ 'full'
 *təhop 'turtle'
 *təhuəl 'to blow'
 *təkɔɔʔ 'pus'
 *təmɔʔ 'stone'
 *təmkal 'male'
 *təniit 'lip'
 *təŋ(k)əm 'molar'
 *tiɛk 'to sleep'
 *tiɛl 'footprint'
 *tiil 'to dry'
 *tool 'to carry on head'
 *tuəs 'to pull out'
 *wɔɔk 'to wake up'
 *we(e)n 'to throw out'
 *weeh 'they two (3D)'
 *weel 'again'
 *wɛ̃ɛ̃n 'to squeeze'
 *wiɛl 'left (side)'
 *yɛɛʔ 'I (1S)'
 *ʔaap 'tiger'
 *ʔaat 'stick/spear'
 *ʔas 'to swell'
 *ʔawak 'ladle'
 *ʔɔ̃ɔ̃ɲ 'to smell'
 *ʔɔɔs 'fire'
 *ʔə[k]ʔaak 'crow'
 *ʔɛc 'belly, excrement'
 *ʔəmpuaʔ 'to dream'
 *ʔəndɯɯm 'ripe'
 *ʔəɲiiʔ 'before'
 *ʔəntaŋ 'ear'
 *ʔəntap 'testicle'
 *ʔiiɲ 'I (1S)'
 *ʔoo[k/ŋ] 'wasp'
 *ʔoor 'to command'
 *ʔuək 'to give'
 *ʔuuy 'to do'

Lexical innovations
Selected Aslian lexical innovations as identified by Paul Sidwell (2021):

Phonological correspondences
Proto-Aslian appears to have some phonological rime correspondences with Nancowry, suggesting that there could be a Southern Austroasiatic branch or linkage that includes Aslian and Nicobaric. Gérard Diffloth (2008) presents the following comparisons (as quoted in Sidwell 2021).

See also
Proto-Austroasiatic language

References

Phillips, Timothy C. 2012. Proto-Aslian: towards an understanding of its historical linguistic systems, principles and processes. Ph.D. thesis, Institut Alam Dan Tamadun Melayu Universiti Kebangsaan Malaysia, Bangi.
Sidwell, Paul and Felix Rau (2015). "Austroasiatic Comparative-Historical Reconstruction: An Overview." In Jenny, Mathias and Paul Sidwell, eds (2015). The Handbook of Austroasiatic Languages. Leiden: Brill.

Aslian languages
Aslian